Clout archery is a form of archery in which archers shoot arrows at a flag (known as "the Clout") from a relatively long distance and score points depending on how close each arrow lands to the flag.

Scoring zones are defined by maximum radii from the flag pole. Each arrow scores points depending on which scoring zone it enters the ground in. An arrow embedded in the flag pole is counted as being in the highest scoring zone. If an arrow is lying on the ground, it is considered to be in the scoring zone in which its point lies.

The scoring zones may be marked on the ground. Where this is not practical, a non-stretch rope or chain marked with the radii of the scoring zones is attached to the flag pole and swept around it to determine which arrows are in which zones.

A designated person collects the arrows in each zone, sorts them into sets, and lays them on the ground. Each archer in turn points to his or her arrows and calls out the scores in descending order.

A single clout round consists of three dozen arrows, shot in ends of 6 arrows. Tournaments typically consist of a double clout round, in which a total of six dozen arrows is shot.

Archery GB clout 

The Archery GB version of clout is used in the United Kingdom. The information in this section is drawn from Part 7 Clout Shooting of the Grand National Archery Society's Rules of Shooting. (GNAS 2008)

Flags are set at specified distances for combinations of age and gender. The archer's bow type does not affect the distance the archer shoots.

Each flag consists of a  square piece of coloured fabric on a short softwood pole, the flag to be as close to the ground as is practical.

Shooting may be "one way" or "two way":

 one way shooting: a single shooting line and a single set of flags are set up at opposite ends of the range. The archers shoot from the shooting line towards the flags, walk to the flags without their bows to score and collect their arrows, then walk back to the shooting line to continue shooting in the same direction.
 two-way shooting: two shooting lines and two sets of flags are set up. One shooting line and one set of flags is placed at one end of the range; the other shooting line and other set of flags is placed at the other end. The archers shoot from one shooting line towards one set of flags, walk to the flags with their bows to score and collect their arrows, then turn around and shoot towards the other set of flags.

A minimum overshoot is required behind each set of flags.

Most Archery GB clout shoots are one-way.

Each arrow scores points depending on which scoring zone it lands in. Scoring zones are defined by maximum radii from the flag pole.

BLBS clout 

The British Long-Bow Society has its own form of clout shooting. The Society restricts the archers to the use of English longbows and wooden arrows.

Ladies shoot , gentlemen . BLBS clouts are generally two-way.

The target is a  diameter, white, resting on a frame at 45 degrees to the ground with a  central black spot.

Scoring is 6 for a clout, down to 1 for the outside ring. 2 rounds of 36 arrows in 12 ends of 3 are shot to make a 'Double Clout Round'

At the Woodmen of Arden's traditional shoots, the 'marker' at the target end steps from behind his screen, lies on his back and waves his top hat in the air to signify that a clout has been scored.

WA clout 

The WA version of clout is used worldwide. The information in this section is drawn from Book 5 Miscellaneous of the WA Constitution and Rules. (WA 2008)

Flags are set at specified distances for combinations of gender and bow type.

The WA rules do not define any separate distances for juniors or for longbows, though tournament organisers will often introduce such additional distances.

Shooting may only be "one way".

Australian clout 

The Archery Australia version of clout is used in Australia. The information in this section is drawn from Section 12 Clout Archery of the Archery Australia Constitution and Rules. (AUST –  online version)

Several possible shooting distances are defined. The archer selects the distance he or she wants to shoot, though for record purposes only certain combinations of age class, gender, bow division and distance are  recognised.

The same clout target may be used for archers shooting at different distances. A shooting line is set up for each distance and the shooting is staggered so that each distance is shot with safety in mind. All archers shoot at the same time.

Small flags are placed on each side of the clout at  intervals, so that the archers can see where the outer edges of the even-numbered scoring zones are. The flags are colored as (from the centre), gold, red,  blue, black and white (i.e. the colours of an archery target).

Shooting is only in one direction (generally to the south).

Each arrow scores points depending on which scoring zone it lands in. Scoring zones are defined by maximum radii from the flag pole. There are ten zones in Australian clout. Zones may be marked on the ground, but these are not used for scoring. Only the scoring zones marked on the rope or chain are used for scoring.

See also
Archery
Target archery
Field archery
History of archery
Arrow
Bow

References

 
  Note: FITA is now officially known as the World Archery Federation, abbreviated as WA.
 

Archery